New Guy or variants may refer to:

"New Guys", first episode of the ninth season of the American comedy television series The Office
The New Guy, 2002 American teen comedy film directed by Ed Decter
"New Guy" (song), song by Ghanaian rapper Sarkodie